Belfast Cathedral may refer to:

St Peter's Cathedral, Belfast, the Roman Catholic cathedral
St Anne's Cathedral, Belfast, the Church of Ireland cathedral